The men's long jump event  at the 1979 European Athletics Indoor Championships was held on 25 February in Vienna.

Results

References

Long jump at the European Athletics Indoor Championships
Long